Giovanni Paolo Lancelotti was an Italian canonist.

Biography
He was born in Perugia in 1522. He graduated as a doctor of law in 1546, and taught law shortly afterwards (1547 or 1548) in the university of his native town. Except for two short sojourns in Rome, he passed the remainder of his life in Perugia, in the study of law and belles-lettres. He died there on 23 September 1590.

Works
He owes his worldwide reputation to his "Institutiones Juris Canonici", the text of which is reproduced in most editions of the "Corpus Juris Canonici". Following the example of the Byzantine Emperor Justinian, who had entrusted to three professors the task of drawing up an elementary work on Roman law entitled the "Institutiones", intended for use in the schools, Lancelotti conceived the plan of a like work on the Catholic Church's canon law. Pope Paul IV charged him officially with the execution of his plan, and for this purpose he went to Rome in 1557. To his great regret, neither Paul IV who died in 1559, nor his successor Pius IV gave authentic and official approbation to his work, published by Lancelotti at Venice in 1563 as an entirely private venture.
 
The "Institutiones" are divided into four books, treating successively persons, things (especially marriage), judgments and crimes. This division was inspired by a principle of Roman law: Omne jus quo utimur vel ad personas attinet, vel ad res, vel ad actiones (All our law treats of persons, or things, or judicial procedure.) It is a small and very simple didactic work, and may be considered a clear, convenient resume of canon law. Its divisions have been followed on broad lines by later authors of elementary treatises on canon law, and they have also borrowed its title "Institutiones". Lancelotti, however, erred when he applied to canon law the unsuitable divisions of Roman law.
 
Having been published before the promulgation of the Council of Trent, this work had not the advantage of following its decrees; subsequent editors have remedied this defect by notes and commentaries. The best-known editions are those of Doujat (Paris, 1684; Venice, 1739), Durand de Maillane (1770) and Christian Thomasius (Halle, 1715–17).
 
Lancelotti's other writings are: "Institutionum juris canonici commentarium" (Perugia, 1560; Lyons, 1579), in which he gives the history of his aforesaid work; "De comparatione juris pontificii et caesarei et utriusque interpretandi ratione" (Lyons, 1574); "Regularum ex universo pontificio jure libri tres" (Perugia, 1587); "Quaestio an in cautione de non offendendo praestita comprehendantur banniti nostri temporis" (Lyons, 1587).

Sources

 Laurent Kondratuk, "L'introduction de la masse Personae-Res-Actiones dans la science canonique (XVIe siècle)", Bibliothèque d'Humanisme et Renaissance, Librairie Droz, 2014, LXXVI/3, pp. 433–449: https://hal.archives-ouvertes.fr/hal-01488282

Lancelotti, Giovanni Paolo
1522 births
1590 deaths
16th-century Italian jurists
People from Perugia